Adolf Albin (14 September 1848 – 22 March 1920) was a Romanian chess player. He is best known for the countergambit that bears his name and for authoring the first chess book written in Romanian.

Life 
He was born in Bucharest, Romania to a wealthy family. His forefathers, however, sprang from Hamburg, Germany and settled in Zhitomir, Ukraine in the 19th century, but later moved to Romania. After completing his studies in Vienna, he went back to Romania, where he ran the Frothier Printing House in Bucharest. Soon he became associated with Dr. Bethel Henry Baron von Stroussberg, working as a translator for the influential railroad tycoon who was nicknamed "The King of Railways". Stroussberg's financial bankruptcy in 1875 led to Albin's exile in Vienna once again, together with his wife and three children. He died at age 72 in a Vienna sanatorium.

Chess career 
Albin came to chess relatively late: according to The Oxford Companion to Chess he learnt the game in his 20s and did not play in international events until his 40s. His best result came at New York 1893, where he finished second behind Emanuel Lasker (who scored a perfect 13/13), ahead of Jackson Showalter, Harry Nelson Pillsbury and others. He played in the very strong tournaments at Hastings 1895 (scoring 8½/21) and Nuremberg  1896 (scoring 7/18). His tournament results on the whole were spotty, though he won individual games against several notable players, including world champion Wilhelm Steinitz at New York 1894 and Nuremberg 1896. He authored the first chess book in Romanian, Amiculŭ Joculu de Scachu Teoreticu şi Practicu (published in Bucharest in 1872).

Death 
As Michael Lorenz has noted in Chess Note 11752 (March 8, 2020), Albin died on 22 March 1920, and not on 1 February 1920 as previously believed.

Legacy 

Albin is the eponym of several chess opening variations, notably the Albin Countergambit in the Queen's Gambit (1.d4 d5 2.c4 e5) and the Albin Attack (also known as the Alekhine–Chatard Attack) in the French Defence (1.e4 e6 2.d4 d5 3.Nc3 Nf6 4.Bg5 Be7 5.e5 Nfd7 6.h4).

References 

Bibliography

Urcan, Olimpiu G. (2008). Adolf Albin in America: A European Chess Master's Sojourn, 1893–1895. (McFarland & Co. Inc. Publishers).

External links 
 
  (1999). Adolf Albin: The Teacher of Nimzovich? . chessarch.com.
 Urcan, Olimpiu G. (2004). Adolf Albin and the Genesis of the Albin Counter Gambit Part I (PDF). Chesscafe.com.
 Urcan, Olimpiu G. (2004). Adolf Albin and the Genesis of the Albin Counter Gambit Part II (PDF). Chesscafe.com.

1848 births
1920 deaths
19th-century chess players
19th-century Romanian people
Chess theoreticians
Romanian people of Austrian descent
Chess players from Bucharest